For the American band see Matthew Melton

Bare Wires is a studio album by John Mayall's Bluesbreakers, featuring Mick Taylor on guitar, released in 1968 on Decca Records. The album was the last John Mayall studio album to feature the name "Bluesbreakers". The album was also Mayall's first successful U.S. album reaching #59 on the Billboard 200.

It was voted number 566 in the third edition of Colin Larkin's All Time Top 1000 Albums (2000).

Background 
The previous Bluesbreakers album Crusade saw guitarist Peter Green, who left to form Fleetwood Mac, being replaced by Mick Taylor. This album saw bassist Andy Fraser, who would later join Free, being replaced by Tony Reeves, while drummer Keef Hartley was replaced by Jon Hiseman.  The album included more jazz influences than usual. Then Tony Reeves, Jon Hiseman and Dick Heckstall-Smith left to form Colosseum.

Songs 
The songs "No Reply" and "She's Too Young" were released as a single by Decca. The album's A-side was a medley called "Bare Wires Suite" which featured the individual songs "Bare Wires", "Where Did I Belong", "I Started Walking", "Open Up a New Door", "Fire", "I Know Now" and "Look in the Mirror".  The individual track times shown below are those printed on the original vinyl release.

Track listing

Original album

Reissue Bonus Tracks

Personnel 
John Mayall's Bluesbreakers
 John Mayall – vocals, harmonica, piano, harpsichord, organ, harmonium, guitar
on tracks 1 - 7 and 10 - 13:
 Mick Taylor – lead guitar, Hawaiian guitar
 Chris Mercer – tenor, baritone saxophone
 Dick Heckstall-Smith – tenor, soprano saxophone
 Jon Hiseman – drums, percussion
 Henry Lowther – cornet, violin
 Tony Reeves – string bass, bass guitar
 Peter Green – guitar on "Picture on the Wall" and "Jenny"
 Keef Hartley – drums on "Picture on the Wall"

Production
 Mike Vernon, John Mayall – producers
 Derek Varnals – engineer
 Pete Smith, Jan Persson – photography

Charts

References 

1968 albums
John Mayall albums
Decca Records albums
London Records albums
Albums produced by Mike Vernon (record producer)
John Mayall & the Bluesbreakers albums
Albums produced by John Mayall